Nikolay Markovich Emanuel (October 1, 1915 – December 7, 1984) was a Soviet chemist. He was a key specialist in chemical kinetics and mechanics of  chemical reactions. He lectured at Moscow State University since 1944 (and was appointed full Professor in 1950). In 1958 he became a corresponding  member and in 1966 he became a full member of the Soviet Academy of Sciences. In 1974, he was elected as a foreign member of the Royal Swedish Academy of Sciences. Buried in Moscow.

References
 
 
 

1915 births
1984 deaths
Full Members of the USSR Academy of Sciences
Soviet chemists
Members of the Royal Swedish Academy of Sciences